Marusyllus is a genus of spiders in the family Salticidae, found in Russia, Central Asia, the Indian subcontinent and China.

Taxonomy
The genus Marusyllus was erected by Jerzy Prószyński in 2016 when he split the genus Yllenus into three (the other  genus being Logunyllus, now considered a synonym of Pseudomogrus). Prószyński placed the three genera in his informal group "yllenines". Yllenus sensu lato is placed in the tribe Leptorchestini, part of the Salticoida clade in the subfamily Salticinae.

Species
, the World Spider Catalog accepted the following species:

Marusyllus aralicus (Logunov & Marusik, 2003) – Azerbaijan, Turkmenistan, Kazakhstan
Marusyllus auspex (O. Pickard-Cambridge, 1885) – Pakistan, Mongolia, China
Marusyllus bajan (Prószyński, 1968) – Mongolia, China
Marusyllus bator (Prószyński, 1968) – Mongolia, China
Marusyllus coreanus (Prószyński, 1968) – Russia, Central Asia, Korea, Mongolia
Marusyllus gregoryi (Logunov, 2010) – India
Marusyllus hamifer (Simon, 1895) (type species) – Mongolia
Marusyllus kalkamanicus (Logunov & Marusik, 2000) – Kazakhstan, China
Marusyllus karnai (Logunov & Marusik, 2003) – India
Marusyllus kotchevnik (Logunov & Marusik, 2003) – Turkmenistan
Marusyllus maoniuensis (Liu, Wang & Peng, 1991) – China
Marusyllus mongolicus (Prószyński, 1968) – Russia, Central Asia, Mongolia
Marusyllus murgabicus (Logunov & Marusik, 2003) – Tajikistan
Marusyllus namulinensis (Hu, 2001) – China
Marusyllus pamiricus (Logunov & Marusik, 2003) – Tajikistan
Marusyllus pseudobajan (Logunov & Marusik, 2003) – China
Marusyllus robustior (Prószyński, 1968) – China
Marusyllus tuvinicus (Logunov & Marusik, 2000) – Russia
Marusyllus uzbekistanicus (Logunov & Marusik, 2003) – Uzbekistan, Turkmenistan, Kazakhstan

References

Salticidae
Salticidae genera
Spiders of Asia